The Journal of the Royal Institute of Chemistry was a scientific journal published by the Royal Institute of Chemistry which combined with other societies in 1980 to form the Royal Society of Chemistry (RSC). It had various names, including those with the title of the Institute prior to gaining its royal charter:-

 Journal of the Royal Institute of Chemistry (1950-1964)
 Journal and Proceedings of the Royal Institute of Chemistry (1949)
 Journal and Proceedings of the Royal Institute of Chemistry of Great Britain and Ireland (1944-1948)
 Journal and Proceedings of the Institute of Chemistry of Great Britain and Ireland (1920-1943)
 Proceedings of the Institute of Chemistry of Great Britain and Ireland (1877-1919)

See also
 Royal Institute of Chemistry Reviews
 List of scientific journals
 List of scientific journals in chemistry

External links
RSC archive site for this journal

Chemistry journals
Royal Society of Chemistry academic journals
Royal Institute of Chemistry
Publications established in 1877
1877 establishments in the United Kingdom